Villa Manin is a Venetian villa located in the comune of  in Codroipo, Friuli-Venezia Giulia, in northeastern Italy.

It was the residence of the last Doge of Venice, Ludovico Manin. Napoleon Bonaparte and Josephine de Beauharnais lived there for about two months in 1797.  Many negotiations for the signing of Treaty of Campoformio on 17 October 1797 between Napoleonic France and the Habsburg Austria were conducted here.

Villa Manin was restored in the 1960s.  Since then, it has hosted numerous popular music concerts by major international acts and was the site of three episodes of Jeux sans frontières.  It housed a contemporary art center and museum from 2004 to 2008 that hosted major international exhibitions, and is  home to the Roberto Capucci Foundation.

The building 
It is a monumental architectural complex built in the sixteenth century at the behest of the noble Friulian Antonio Manin who, at the loss of the dominion of the seas, focused on the resources offered by the mainland, setting up a farm and putting a manor house at his center.

The Manin family, documented in Florence since 1000, had arrived in Friuli (Aquileia and Cividale) as a result of the struggles between the Guelphs and Ghibellines and held that role and the politics in mainland of Venice which will be fully developed in the sixteenth century, a time when Antonio Manin came into possession of the gastaldato of Sedegliano and settled in Passariano.

The first factory of the villa is dated between 1650 and 1660.

In the following years, the grandchildren Ludovico Manin I and Francesco IV took up the project, perhaps aided by the architect Giuseppe Benone. The original appearance of the seventeenth-century villa was radically different from the current one, due to the transformations and enlargements in eighteenth century by Ludovico II and Ludovico III (called Alvise), made first by the Venetian architect Domenico Rossi (who in 1707 designed the square plaza and, after 1718, perhaps realizes the current monumental exedra), and then by Giovanni Ziborghi, who between 1730 and 1740 did raise the barchesse (barn wings). The raising of the noble central core, built with the consulting of Giorgio Massari, was realized after 1745. The large garden (over 17 acres) in the back appears to be due to the will of the "master of the house" Ziborghi.

The nephew, Ludovico Manin, later transformed it into an organic complex that, in addition to agricultural functions, also reflects a desire for social representation.

Substantial interventions of nineteenth century, especially by Giannantonio Selva, modified the original garden, giving us today a place complicated by the alterations and replacements of the same tree species.

Chapel of Sant'Andrea 
To the villa complex also belongs the chapel of Sant'Andrea (St. Andrew), built in the early eighteenth century (1708) by Domenico Rossi and located outside the square plaza adjoining the barchessa and to the east gate. The building is square with rounded corners (almost an octagon). The façade, with gable and two pairs of columns at sides is adorned on the edge of the pediment with statues and marble groups by Pietro Baratta. Inside, in the sacristy, there are two marble altars by Giuseppe Bernardi-Torretti, and in the hall two other marble altars with altarpiece worked in relief by the same Torretti.

Decoration 
As well as a fine piece of architecture, the villa is also important for the eighteenth-century artworks. The villa is decorated with frescoes by Ludovico Dorigny, Jacopo Amigoni and Pietro Oretti, paintings by Francesco Fontebasso and sculptures by Torretti.

In a room to the east, in 1708, the Parisian Ludovico Dorigny frescoed on the ceiling, within the central round, the Triumph of Spring and the four smaller ovals surrounding the allegories of Love, Glory, Wealth, Abundantia. His painting, in cool and dazzling colors preferring elegant figures on a background of clear skies and adopting reckless solutions (cherubs and nymphs on clouds going beyond the frame), is on the whole academic and conventional. On the walls, in monochrome on golden background, are painted some scenes with Apollo and Mars, Venus and Bacchus, the Judgement of Paris, and Pan and Syrinx between various allegorical figures. The paintings show the chiaroscuro of French taste, and inspired the young Tiepolo, called to work at the Archbishopric of Udine in 1726–1730.

Recent history 
In 1962, Villa Manin became property of the Ente Ville Venete (now Istituto Regionale Ville Venete - Venetian Villas Regional Institute) by ministerial decree of public interest, which authorized the expropriation at the symbolic price of 140 million Lire: a price of bankruptcy liquidation considering the state of abandonment in which the residence of the last doge Ludovico Manin stood.

The Venetian Villas Authority began the restoration of the villa at a cost of about 200 million lire. The question was the dispensation of villa once restored, with a usable area of 1,800 square meters and a 19-hectare garden. In this climate of uncertainty, the project by Aldo Rizzi (art historian and director of the Civic Museums of Udine) to take the ancient noble residence a prestigious venue for major art exhibitions met the favor of the Municipality of Udine. This idea found the favor of the Autonomous Region of Friuli-Venezia Giulia, which in 1969 bought the villa from the Ente Ville Venete. Rizzi, curator of the villa from 1972 to 1993, organized in 1971 the memorable inaugural exhibition of Tiepolo (325,000 visitors) and created the School of Restoration, which saved many masterpieces of art after the 1976 Friuli earthquake.  From 2004 to 2008, the villa housed a contemporary art center (q.v.), and now is the site of fashion designer Roberto Capucci's foundation (q.v.).

Villa Manin was also home to three famous episodes of the international TV show Jeux Sans Frontières: one in 1972 and two in 1993. It hosted the King of Pain Sting tour on 25 July 1993. On 24 July 2008, it hosted the American rock band R.E.M. In 2010, Motörhead played the villa on 28 June and Iron Maiden on 17 August. On 13 August 2012, it hosted a Foo Fighters concert, and on 26 September of that same year, it hosted Radiohead. On 18 June 2013, it hosted a Kiss concert, and a 11 July 2013 a concert by Rammstein.

Collections and exhibitions 
Villa Manin also contains a museum area of considerable interest for the tourist. The permanent exhibitions are a collection of antique carriages in the stables and an extensive armory, with pieces from the Casa della Contadinanza of Udine; many of its 350 rooms have been furnished with antique furniture and paintings from the Museum of Udine, including the so-called "Chamber of Napoleon", where the famous emperor slept, who here signed the Treaty of Campoformio in 1797.

The villa has hosted important exhibitions of ancient art with prestigious names such as the aforementioned Tiepolo, as well as others from the Lombards to Sebastiano Ricci to the abstract art of Kandinsky in 2003. Exhibitions of antiques, concerts and conventions are also noteworthy.

From 2004 to 2008, the Villa Manin Centre for Contemporary Art was characterized by an annual program that alternated thematic exhibitions with artists from all over the world, collaborations with leading international museums, sculpture projects in the garden, exhibitions dedicated to artists of the local area (Spazio FVG) and various side events. The artistic direction was entrusted to Francesco Bonami. Some exhibitions: Love Hate From Magritte to Cattelan (2004), The Theatre of the Arts - Masterpieces from the collection of the Ludwig Museum, Luna park fantastic art - Sculpture in the Park (2005), Infinite Painting - Contemporary Painting and Global Realism (2006), Hiroshi Sugimoto (2007), God & Goods (2008).

The villa hosted major international exhibitions, such as the anthology of Giuseppe Zigaina (until 30 August 2009), the great Impressionist exhibition From Courbet to Monet, The spread of Realism and Impressionism in Central and Eastern Europe (26 September 2009 - 7 March 2010) and the exhibition Munch and the spirit of the north. Scandinavia in the late nineteenth century (September 2010 - March 2011).

 the villa has been the headquarters of the Roberto Capucci Foundation, with a repository consisting of the fashion designer's clothes and thousands of drawings, illustrations, photgraphs and press articles transferred from Rome.

Sources 
 Candido Grassi, La Villa Manin di Passariano, Del Bianco, Udine 1961
 Aldo Rizzi, La Villa Manin di Passariano, Del Bianco, Udine 1971
 Aldo Rizzi, Mostra del Tiepolo, Electa, Milano 1971
 Aldo Rizzi, La Villa dell'ultimo Doge, Ghedina, Cortina 1976
 Aldo Rizzi, Capolavori d'arte in Friuli, Electa, Milano 1976
 Aldo Rizzi, La villa Manin di Passariano e le grandi Ville venete, Tassotti, 1986
 Amedeo Giacomini, Il Giardiniere di Villa Manin, Santi Quaranta, 2002
 Francesca Venuto, La Villa di Passariano, dimora e destino dei nobili Manin, Associazione fra le Pro Loco del Friuli-Venezia Giulia, Codroipo, 2001

References

External links 

Villa Manin - Official site

Villas in Friuli-Venezia Giulia
Province of Udine
Contemporary art galleries in Italy